The 1924 Ole Miss Rebels football team was an American football team that represented the University of Mississippi in the Southern Conference during the 1924 college football season. In its first and only season under head coach Chester S. Barnard, the team compiled a 4–5 record (0–3 against conference opponents).  The team played its home games at Vaught–Hemingway Stadium in Oxford, Mississippi

Schedule

References

Ole Miss
Ole Miss Rebels football seasons
Ole Miss Rebels football